Andrea Derjaj (born 26 February 1996) is an Albanian boxer who competes in the 91 kg weight division. He is a 3-time defending national champion in his weight division and is a member of Albania national youth team.

References

Albanian male boxers
Sportspeople from Kavajë
1996 births
Living people